Michal Pančík (born 18 August 1982) is a Slovak football midfielder. He currently plays for MFK Detva.

External links
 
 

1982 births
Living people
Slovak footballers
Slovakia international footballers
Association football midfielders
FK Železiarne Podbrezová players
FK Dukla Banská Bystrica players
Slovak Super Liga players
Sportspeople from Brezno